Nikolai Foliaki (born 25 December 1997) is an Tongan rugby union player, currently playing for the  and . His preferred position is centre.

Early career
Foliaki plays his club rugby for Karaka RFC.

Professional career
Foliaki was first named in the  squad for the 2019 Mitre 10 Cup, and was again named in the 2022 squad. Having spent pre-season with the Western Force, he was named in their squad for Round 3 of the 2023 Super Rugby Pacific season against .

He made his debut for Tonga in 2021 against New Zealand.

References

External links
itsrugby.co.uk Profile

1997 births
Living people
New Zealand rugby union players
Tongan rugby union players
Tonga international rugby union players
Rugby union centres
Counties Manukau rugby union players
Western Force players